YourTV (formerly TVCogeco and CogecoTV) is the brand of community channels owned by Cogeco. YourTV broadcasts into the Canadian provinces of Ontario and Quebec. Some channels broadcast in both the English and French languages, often on separate channels, in which case the French-language station is branded NousTV.

Programming the channels is produced with the assistance of volunteers. This programming was created in response to CRTC regulations which previously required that cable companies produce local content (this is no longer required but strongly encouraged)..

Programming

YourTV in Ontario provides comprehensive coverage of the Ontario Hockey League, broadcasting games in Peterborough, Sarnia, Windsor, North Bay, Kingston and Niagara. Most home and away games of those teams being available only on cable on the local station, while many other OHL games are available as part of a package in partnership with Rogers TV. Quebec systems air Quebec Major Junior Hockey League games, in partnership with Vidéotron.

YourTV also provides community access and community oriented programming, and an electronic bulletin board service, featuring  public service announcements regarding activities and events of local non-profit agencies.

YourTV stations

All YourTV channels are available to Cogeco Cable subscribers. As well, programming is also available to Digital Cable subscribers through Cogeco's "Free On Demand".

Ontario

Central
 Belleville Cable 4/700 HD
 Cobourg Cable 10/700 HD
 Kingston  Cable 13/700 HD
 Peterborough/Kawartha Lakes Cable 10/700 HD

Eastern
 Arnprior Cable 22/700 HD
 Brockville Cable 10/700 HD
 Cornwall Cable 11/700 HD
 Hawkesbury Cable 11
 Pembroke Cable 12/700 HD
 Renfrew Cable 22/700 HD
 Smiths Falls Cable 10/700 HD

Golden Horseshoe
 Burlington/Oakville Cable 23/700 HD
 Milton Cable 14/700 HD
 Fergus Cable 14/700 HD
 Niagara Falls Cable 10/700 HD /Grimsby Cable 14/700 HD /St. Catharines Cable 10/700 HD /Welland Cable 10/700 HD/Niagara-on-the-Lake Cable 10/700HD
(Although Cogeco provides cable service in parts of the Hamilton market, regional monopolies in the region are also held by Rogers Cable and Source Cable. The 3 companies jointly operate a single community channel for Hamilton known as Cable 14, so there is no YourTV channel proper in the region.)

Northern

 Gravenhurst Cable 10 HD 700
 Huntsville Cable 10 HD 700
 North Bay  Cable 12 HD 700
 Parry Sound Cable 11 HD 700

Southwest
 Chatham-Kent Cable 11 HD 700
 Sarnia Cable 6 HD 700
 Windsor Cable 11 HD 700

Quebec

(list does not include local channels not operated by Cogeco)
 Alma
 Baie-Comeau
 Drummondville
 Magog
 Matane
 Montmagny
 Rimouski
 Sept-Îles
 Shawinigan
 Saint-Georges
 Saint-Hyacinthe
 Sainte-Adèle
 Salaberry-de-Valleyfield
 Thetford Mines
 Trois-Rivières (Cogeco-served areas only)

References

External links 
 YourTV.TV
 TV Cogeco Quebec (English)
 Cable 14 Hamilton

Canadian community channels